"My Friend" is a song by Australian pop band Oblivia. It was released in May 2000 as the group's debut single and lead single from their album, The Careless Ones (2001). The song peaked at number 35 on the ARIA charts.

At the ARIA Music Awards of 2000, Steve James won the ARIA Award for Producer of the Year and ARIA Award for Engineer of the Year for "My Friend".

Track listing
 "My Friend"	
 "1-45"
 "Mono Ways"	
 "My Friend" (CD_Rom video)

Charts

Release history

References

2000 songs
Australian pop songs
2000 debut singles
ARIA Award-winning songs